Trixoscelis signifera is a species of fly in the family Heleomyzidae.

References

Heleomyzidae
Articles created by Qbugbot
Insects described in 1952